USS Courser (AMc-32) was a coastal minesweeper acquired by the U.S. Navy for the dangerous task of removing mines from minefields laid in the water to prevent ships from passing. The first ship to be named Courser by the Navy, AMc-32 served in an "in service" status from 1941 to 1947.

References

External links 
 

Minesweepers of the United States Navy
World War II mine warfare vessels of the United States